Museum is a British television documentary series, produced by BBC Wales. It is a behind-the-scenes look at the British Museum, narrated by Ian McMillan and first broadcast on BBC Two on Thursdays at 7.30pm from 10 May 2007. It is in 10 half-hour parts. There is an accompanying hardback book by Rupert Smith.

Crew
Producer/Directors – Chris Rushton, Anthony Holland
Assistant Producer – Andrew Tait
Researcher – Mish Evans
Technical Assistant – Tom Swingler
Production Manager – Ellen Davies
Executive Producer – Sam Organ
Series Producer – Judith Bunting

Episode guide

References

External links
 

BBC television documentaries about history
British Museum in media
2007 British television series debuts
2007 British television series endings